Kim Ji-hyun (Korean:김지현; born on 2 January 1982) is a South Korean actress. She is alumni of Korea National University of Arts, Department of Acting. She made her acting debut in 2006, since then, she has appeared in number of musical plays, films and television series. She is known for her roles in The Smile Has Left Your Eyes (2018) and Justice (2019). She has acted in films as: Solace (2006) and A Little Pond (2009) among others.

Career

Beginnings 
After graduating from Korea National University of Arts, Kim Ji-hyun made her debut in 2004 as a member of the Theater Ganda formed by alumni of her University. She made her acting debut by appearing in the play Mirror Princess Pyeonggang Story in 2004.

Kim started his first commercial Musical work in 2007 with the musical Finding Kim Jong-wook. Kim actually took part when this musical was performed in her university few years before. This musical was actually the first work Kim did when She was doing a workshop at school.

She made her film debut in 2006 with film Solace. She is affiliated to artist management company Vibe Actors.

2020–present: Rise in popularity and lead roles 
In 2020 she appeared in TV series Backstreet Rookie and in 2021 she was cast in TV series Artificial City. 

In 2022, Kim appeared in her first lead role alongside Son Ye-jin and Jeon Mi-do in JTBC's TV series Thirty, Nine, a romantic drama about three friends. In the same year Kim appeared on the cover of March issue of The Musical magazine, being the cast of the Let Me Fly, a musical which depicts a time travel story of protagonist Namwon, who dreamt of becoming a fashion designer in 1969. Starting March 22, she will be seen as Seon-hee in it.

Filmography

Films

Television series

Web series

Stage

Musical

Theater

Awards and nominations

Notes

References

External links
 
 Kim Ji-hyun on Daum 

Living people
1982 births
Korea National University of Arts alumni
South Korean film actresses
South Korean musical theatre actresses
South Korean stage actresses
South Korean television actresses
South Korean web series actresses
21st-century South Korean actresses